The Air Accident Investigation Bureau (AAIB) is an agency of the government of Mongolia. Its head office is on the grounds of Chinggis Khaan International Airport in Ulaanbaatar.

References

External links

 Air Accident Investigation Bureau
 Air Accident Investigation Bureau 

Government agencies of Mongolia
Aviation organizations based in Mongolia
Organizations investigating aviation accidents and incidents